Paul Stewart (born March 21, 1953) is an American former professional ice hockey player and referee. Inducted in the United States Hockey Hall of Fame in 2018, he is the grandson of Bill Stewart. He played 65 games in the World Hockey Association (WHA) between 1976 and 1979, and 21 games in the National Hockey League (NHL) during the 1979–80 season. He later worked as a referee in the NHL from 1986 until 2003

Career 
Stewart played in both the World Hockey Association and the National Hockey League. He played with Mark Messier for the Cincinnati Stingers. His last season of top level professional hockey was 1979–80 with the Quebec Nordiques.

After his playing days ended, he had a lengthy career as an NHL referee, beginning in 1986. He officiated 1,010 regular season games (including Guy Lafleur's final NHL game), 49 playoff games, the 1987 Canada Cup, the 1991 Canada Cup and two All-Star games. He never wore a helmet during his officiating career. From the 1994–95 NHL season until his retirement in 2003, he wore uniform number 22.

Stewart is men's and women's league director of officiating for ECAC Hockey, and in 2012, also took on duties as a judicial and discipline consultant to the Kontinental Hockey League.

Career statistics

Regular season and playoffs

References

External links
 

1953 births
Living people
American men's ice hockey left wingers
American ice hockey officials
Binghamton Dusters players
Binghamton Whalers players
Broome Dusters players
Boston Bruins announcers
Cape Cod Buccaneers players
Cincinnati Stingers (CHL) players
Cincinnati Stingers players
Edmonton Oilers (WHA) players
Ice hockey people from Boston
Mohawk Valley Stars players
National Hockey League officials
New Haven Nighthawks players
Penn Quakers men's ice hockey players
People from Dorchester, Massachusetts
Philadelphia Firebirds (AHL) players
Quebec Nordiques players
Undrafted National Hockey League players